Carlos Roberto PenaVega (born August 15, 1989) is an American actor and singer. He starred on the Nickelodeon series Big Time Rush as Carlos García, and is a member of the group Big Time Rush. He was also the host of the network's game show Webheads. He currently voices Bobby Santiago in The Loud House.

Early life
PenaVega was born on August 15, 1989, in Columbia, Missouri. His father is Spanish and Venezuelan, and his mother is Dominican. He was raised in Weston, Florida. He attended Sagemont Upper School where he was a cheerleader. He appeared in local productions of Grease and Man of La Mancha. He also had a role in a production of Titanic by the American Heritage School, which he attended before moving to Los Angeles to pursue an acting career. During his run in Titanic he fell in love with singing and dancing.

Career

2004–2013: Career beginning and Big Time Rush

His first acting role was a guest star at the age of 15 on ER, followed later that year by guest-starring roles on Judging Amy, Summerland, and Ned's Declassified School Survival Guide. While still in high school, PenaVega appeared in television commercials for the Super Soaker brand recreational water gun, and his image even appeared on the toy's packaging. PenaVega was studying musical theater at the Boston Conservatory when his manager urged him to audition for Big Time Rush. Although he was reluctant to do so, he submitted an audition tape and won the role almost two years later. PenaVega moved to Hollywood in August 2009, The show had four seasons and was one of the most popular shows in Nickelodeon.

Big Time Rush is an American pop boy band that formed in 2009. The band consists of PenaVega, Kendall Schmidt, James Maslow, and Logan Henderson, all on vocals. PenaVega co-wrote the song "Oh Yeah" off of the group's first album, BTR. On the second album, he wrote "Invisible" along with Charley Greenberg, Cody Williams, Daniel Andrew Wayne and J.R. Rotem. As of 2011, the band has released two albums, BTR and Elevate. They later released their third album, 24/Seven. He co-wrote "Picture This" with bandmate, James Maslow. PenaVega wrote "Lost in Love" for his wife, Alexa PenaVega. He also wrote the song "Na Na Na" on 24/Seven. In addition, BTR embarked on the Summer Break Tour, in support of the album.

Awards & Nominations 
For his performance in Big Time Rush, he was nominated two times in the ALMA Awards and Imagen Awards, and receive three consecutive NAACP Image Awards, but he didn't win any of those awards.
He and his partners of Big Time Rush were honored in 2010 in the category "One to Watch" at the Young Hollywood Awards.

2014–2017: Solo career
He released his first solo single in Spanish on February 4, 2014, titled "Electrico". The song charted in the top 10 of the Latin iTunes songs charts. He was presented for the first time at the first annual Nickelodeon Colombia Kids' Choice Awards given in Bogotá. PenaVega competed on the 21st season of Dancing with the Stars in Fall 2015. His wife was also a contestant that season. His professional partner was Witney Carson. PenaVega and Carson reached the finals but were eliminated on the week's performance night and ended the competition in fourth place. In 2017 he released the single Bésame featuring MAFFiO.   
  
2017–present: Hallmark, BTR Reunion & Book

In 2017 he starred alongside his wife in the Hallmark movie Enchanted Christmas and alongside Adelaide Kane in A Midnight Kiss. In 2018 he starred alongside his wife again in the Hallmark movie Love at Sea. He was a series regular in the one season CW series Life Sentence. In 2019 PenaVega and his wife starred in the Hallmark movie series Picture Perfect Mysteries.

In 2021 Big Time Rush announced they would be reuniting for shows in New York and Chicago. The band also made an appearance at several Jingle Ball concerts in December 2021. In 2022 they announced the Forever Tour that would take them around the U.S. and Mexico. His family has travelled on the tour with him.

Carlos and Alexa PenaVega released a book in 2022 called What If Love is the Point.

Personal life
In 2012, PenaVega began dating American actress Alexa Vega after meeting her at a bible study. She guest appeared in the series finale episode of Big Time Rush, aired in July 2013, where she played the on-screen new girlfriend of his character. The couple became engaged in August 2013, and were married on January 4, 2014, in Puerto Vallarta, Mexico, both taking PenaVega as their married name. They are both devout Christians. The couple shares a YouTube channel, La Vida PenaVega (formerly LexLovesLos). The couple have two sons, one born in December 2016 and the other in June 2019.  In December 2020, they announced they were expecting their third child, a daughter, born in May 2021.

Filmography

Film

Television

Discography

Singles

Other appearances

References

External links
 
 
 

1989 births
Living people
American male child actors
American child singers
American male television actors
American game show hosts
American baritones
Male actors from Florida
American Christians
American YouTubers
Big Time Rush (band) members
American people of Dominican Republic descent
American people of Venezuelan descent
American people of Spanish descent
People from Weston, Florida
Male actors from Missouri
21st-century American male actors
Actors from Columbia, Missouri
Singers from Columbia, Missouri
21st-century American singers
American Heritage School (Florida) alumni